Manuel José Dias Soares Costa (19 March 1933 – 2 September 2021) was a Portuguese politician who served as Minister of Agriculture from 1983 to 1984. He was born in Lisbon.

References

1933 births
2021 deaths
People from Lisbon
Portuguese politicians
Agriculture ministers of Portugal